James Alan Bidgood (March 28, 1933 – January 31, 2022) was an American filmmaker, photographer and visual and performance artist, known for his highly stylized and homoerotic works.

Life and career 

James Alan Bidgood was born in Stoughton, Wisconsin, and grew up in Madison, Wisconsin. He moved to New York City in 1951. His artistic output embraced a number of media and disciplines, including music, set and window design, and drag performance. In time, his interests led him to photography and film and it is for this work that he is most widely known. Highly recognizable, his photographs are distinguished by an aesthetic of high fantasy and camp. His work which was inspired by an early interest in Florenz Ziegfeld, Folies Bergère, and George Quaintance has, in turn, served as important inspiration for a slew of artists including Pierre et Gilles and David LaChapelle. In the late 1950s, Bidgood attended Parsons The New School for Design.

Bidgood released the film Pink Narcissus in 1971, after filming in his small apartment from 1963 to 1970. The film is a dialogue-free fantasy centered around a young and often naked man. The film took seven years to make, and Bidgood built all the sets and filmed the entire piece in his tiny apartment. He later removed his name from the film because he felt editors had changed his original vision. Consequently, the identity of the film's creator was only a matter of speculation for nearly three decades after its release, with Andy Warhol frequently floated as a candidate. It was not until 1998 that writer Bruce Benderson decided to investigate the matter, and eventually traced them to Bidgood, then living on 14th Street in Manhattan. Through a friend who was an agent, Benderson arranged publication of Bidgood's output under his own name for the first time and also wrote the first complete monograph on Bidgood, which was published by Taschen. Bidgood's film Pink Narcissus was re-released in 2003 by Strand Releasing.

Bidgood's work is characterized by a heavy reliance on invention. His photographs feature elaborate sets built ground up from the materials of the theatre, fashion, design, and fine art. In a profile of the artist published in Aperture, Philip Gefter wrote,

Many contemporary themes are found even in the earliest of Bidgood's work. Camp, identity, erotica, desire, marginality, and performance all figure heavily in his portraits of nude men. Bidgood's complex references to the theatre and performance seem to presage Queer articulations of Performance. His techniques, working processes, and masterful use of illusionistic color indicate both a mature understanding of his influences and goals and an important contrast to the art movements of the time the work was first created.
In 1999, the art book publisher Taschen published a monograph of his work including biographical images and stills from his film.
In 2005, Bidgood was honored with a Creative Capital grant which facilitated a return to art photography after a hiatus of nearly 40 years. His later projects include work for Christian Louboutin and Out magazine.
In 2008, Taschen included an interview with Bidgood in its publication The Big Penis Book, and published his monograph in 2009. Bidgood's more recent work was featured in Out in February 2009. Bidgood was represented by ClampArt in New York City, as well as Larry Collins Fine Art in Provincetown, Massachusetts.

Bidgood died from complications of COVID-19 at a Manhattan hospital on January 31, 2022, aged 88.

References

External links 
 
 James Bidgood at BadPuppy
 James Bidgood Nov. 2005 Interview in Bright Lights Film Journal
 BUTT Magazine interview 2010

1933 births
2022 deaths
20th-century American artists
21st-century American artists
American photographers
Artists from Madison, Wisconsin
Deaths from the COVID-19 pandemic in New York (state)
Film directors from Wisconsin
American gay artists
LGBT film directors
LGBT people from Wisconsin
American LGBT photographers
People from Madison, Wisconsin
People from Stoughton, Wisconsin